Ibstone (previously Ipstone) is a village and civil parish within Wycombe district in Buckinghamshire, England.

The village name is Anglo Saxon in origin and means 'Hibba's boundary stone', referring to the boundary with Oxfordshire.  At the time of King Edward the Confessor the village was in the possession of Tovi, thane of the king, and was called Hibestanes.

The parish church, dedicated to Saint Nicholas, stands separate from the rest of the village; this is a common occurrence in places in this part of the country that had some standing in the pre-Roman Celtic period.

The village includes Cobstone Windmill. The windmill was built around 1816 and is unusual in that it is a twelve-sided smock mill, still housing some of its original machinery. It was converted into a residency during the 1950s and then refurbished after 1971. It was also used as Caractacus Potts' workshop in the 1968 film,  Chitty Chitty Bang Bang and seen in The New Avengers (TV series) episode, The House of Cards. The actress Hayley Mills and her film producer husband Roy Boulting owned the windmill and lived there in the early 1970s.

The politician Barbara Castle also lived in the village.

The common is an area of open access land and the standing stone (OS GR SU7507 9371) was erected for the Millennium -year 2000.

Ibstone is the name given to a hymn tune composed in 1875 by Maria C. Tiddeman (1837–1915), music professor in Oxford University.

See also
Wormsley Park

References

External links

St Nicholas' Church

Villages in Buckinghamshire
Civil parishes in Buckinghamshire